Saizerais Aerodrome,  was a temporary World War I airfield in France.

Overview
The airfield was built in late Spring 1916 by and for the French Air Service, and continuously operational until early April 1918.

484th Aero Squadron (Construct.) arrived about 10 October 1918, probably to make to tidy up an airfield which had not been used for some time. United States VI Corps Observation Group, Second Army Air Service two squadrons arrived on 23–25 October, with the Group's HQ; Second Army was established in October primarily to carry out offensive operations in the Metz area, however, before it could become fully operational, the war ended and the Group most likely did not perform many missions.

After the armistice, the Group's HQ stayed at Saizerais until being disbanded on 15 April 1919. The 354th Aero Squadron moved to Rhineland, while its second squadron, 8th Aero Squadron, had already left in late November 1918. The airfield was eventually returned to agricultural use; today it is a series of cultivated fields located 1/2 miles to the southwest of Saizerais, at the edge of Saizerais forest's northern tip.

Known units assigned
 Headquarters, VI Corps Observation Group, 25 Oct - 15 April 1919
 8th Aero Squadron (Observation), 23 October - 21 November 1918
 354th Aero Squadron (Observation), 25 October - 15 April 1919

See also

 List of Air Service American Expeditionary Force aerodromes in France

References

 Series "D", Volume 2, Squadron histories,. Gorrell's History of the American Expeditionary Forces Air Service, 1917–1919, National Archives, Washington, D.C.

External links

20th-century military history of the United States
World War I airfields in France